Gloveria is a genus of moths in the family Lasiocampidae. The genus was erected by Packard in 1872. All the species in the genus are from southern North America.

Species
Based on Lepidoptera and Some Other Life Forms:
Gloveria howardi (Dyar, 1896) Arizona
Gloveria medusa (Strecker, 1898) California
Gloveria gargamelle (Strecker, 1885) Arizona, Texas
Gloveria arizonensis Packard, 1872 California - Texas, Colorado, Utah
Gloveria sphingiformis Barnes & McDunnough, 1910 Texas
Gloveria olivacea H. Edwards, 1884 Mexico
Gloveria concinna Dyar, 1918 Mexico
Gloveria obsoleta Dyar, 1918 Mexico
Gloveria sodom Dyar, 1918 Mexico
Gloveria latipennis Dyar, 1918 Mexico

External links

Lasiocampidae